Billy Talent II is the second studio album by Canadian rock band Billy Talent, released on June 27, 2006. The album debuted at No. 1 on the Canadian Albums Chart, selling 48,000 copies in its first week. The album also reached No. 1 on the German albums chart. Despite its great success in Canada and Germany, the album was not as successful in the United States, where it peaked at No. 134 on the Billboard 200 music chart, selling just 7,231 units in its first week.

Themes 

The album has less anger and language than their previous self-titled album, as they had mellowed out and matured as men and as a band. More of the songs dealt with real-life issues, to the praise of fans and critics.

Release 
The band temporarily released the entire album to their MySpace page for June 23.

Beginning in the fall of 2005, songs from the new album were purposely leaked by the band. A demo of "Red Flag" circulated across the internet, even though it had already appeared on the soundtracks to Burnout Revenge, Burnout Legends, SSX on Tour, NHL 06 and on the Atlantic Records compilation Black by Popular Demand.

"Devil in a Midnight Mass" was the first single. A demo of the song was released on MySpace and Purevolume on Christmas Day of 2005, and the official single was released on April 20, 2006. "Red Flag" was released as the second single. A video for it was shot on July 21, 2006, in Los Angeles.

The day after its debut, the band performed an Intimate & Interactive outdoor concert on MuchMusic in the CHUM-City Building parking lot in Toronto, Ontario. They were also interviewed by Much VJ Devon Soltendieck, and asked questions from viewers via telephone, e-mail, and videophone.

"Surrender" was offered for download exclusively on Valentine's Day, 2006; it also appears on this album. According to a MuchMusic interview with the band, Surrender is supposed to be a love song. Radio recordings of that song, as well as "Covered in Cowardice", "This Suffering", and a low quality version of "Worker Bees" became available several weeks before the album's release.

The music video for their third single, "Fallen Leaves", was shot on the first two days of November 2006, in Los Angeles. It was first played in Canada on Much on Demand on November 27, 2006, and worldwide the following week.

The band performed a live session for Mike Davies on BBC Radio 1's The Lockup on September 12, playing the tracks "Red Flag", "Devil in a Midnight Mass" and "This Suffering".

On November 22, the band made its American premiere on the Late Night with Conan O'Brien show, performing "Red Flag".

On January 12, 2007, the music video for "Fallen Leaves" was made available to watch in the UK on the rock channels Kerrang!, Scuzz and MTV2.

In February 2007, the video for "Surrender" was shot and debuted in Germany on April.2.2007. 

In April 2007, the album won a Juno Award for best rock album of the year.

Although never released as a single, the band shot a music video for "The Navy Song", released exclusively through the band's Myspace, during summer 2007.

On November 26, 2007, the video for "This Suffering" was released. It was released mainly to promote the band's new live DVD 666 Live, and the music video was just a collection of clips from the 666 performances.

Track listing

Personnel 

Billy Talent
Ben Kowalewicz – lead vocals
Ian D'Sa – guitar, vocals
Jon Gallant – bass, backing vocals
Aaron Solowoniuk – drums

Artwork
Liz Barrett – art producer
Kim Kinakin & Henry Fong – artwork
Kim Kinakin – package design
Henry Fong – cover illustration
Ian D'Sa – art direction
Dustin Rabin – photography

Additional musicians
Gavin Brown – tambourine

Production
Gavin Brown – producer
Ian D'Sa – producer
Eric Ratz – engineer
Steve Blair & Mary Gormley – A&R
Chris Lord-Alge – mixing
Brian Gardner - mastering
Kenny Luong – digital editing

Charts

Year-end charts

Certifications

References

External links 
 Official band website
 Interview with Ian and Jon in support of Billy Talent II
 
 Billy Talent at Last.fm

2006 albums
Albums recorded at The Warehouse Studio
Atlantic Records albums
Billy Talent albums
Juno Award for Rock Album of the Year albums